The Jewish Catacombs of Venosa are a set of catacombs located near the Italian city of Venosa, Province of Potenza, on Maddelena Hill.

Description

They were discovered in 1853 and were not systematically studied until 1974.

The structure of the catacombs is simple, with two parallel tunnels connected by passages.

Most of the names listed in the catacombs reflect the tendency of Jewish diaspora to take Greek or Latin names as opposed to names in Hebrew, with only a small minority of the people buried there having names reflecting a Hebrew etymology. The earliest writing in the catacombs is usually in Koine Greek, with Latin existing in the newer and deeper sections of the catacombs. There is more Hebrew text in these catacombs than in the better known Jewish catacombs of Rome. Religious iconography, such as the menorah, can be seen in the catacombs.

References

Buildings and structures in the Province of Potenza
Burials in Basilicata
Jewish catacombs
Jewish cemeteries
Jewish Italian history
Year of establishment missing